Gordon MacDonald (born 2 January 1960) is a Scottish National Party (SNP) politician. He has been the Member of the Scottish Parliament (MSP) for the Edinburgh Pentlands constituency since 2011.

Early life
MacDonald was born in Glasgow and educated at Cumbernauld High School, the Central College of Commerce and the Glasgow College of Technology. He worked as a management accountant for Lothian Buses from 1989 to 2011.

Political career
MacDonald contested the seat of Edinburgh Pentlands in the 2011 Scottish Parliament election, and defeated the Conservative incumbent David McLetchie by a margin of 1,758 votes. He was re-elected to the seat in the 2016 Scottish Parliament election.

Personal life

MacDonald is married to Janet Campbell, who lives in Broxburn and is the SNP Councillor for Broxburn, Uphall and Winchburgh (ward).

References

External links 
 
 Gordon MacDonald constituency website
 Local SNP website covering Gordon MacDonald's constituency, Edinburgh Pentlands

1960 births
Living people
Politicians from Glasgow
People from Cumbernauld
Alumni of Glasgow Caledonian University
Members of the Scottish Parliament 2011–2016
Scottish accountants
Scottish National Party MSPs
Members of the Scottish Parliament for Edinburgh constituencies
Members of the Scottish Parliament 2016–2021
Members of the Scottish Parliament 2021–2026
People educated at Cumbernauld Academy
Politicians from North Lanarkshire